Hardik Singh (born 23 September 1998) is an Indian field hockey player who plays as a midfielder for the Indian national team.

International career
After becoming the vice-captain of the Indian junior team, he made his senior international debut at the 2018 Asian Men's Hockey Champions Trophy and was part of India's squad at the 2018 Men's Hockey World Cup and 2023 Men's Hockey World Cup.

Personal life
Singh's father Varinderpreet Singh Ray, who works as a police officer, played for India, and grandfather Preetam Singh Ray was a hockey coach with the Indian Navy. He regards his paternal uncle and former Indian drag-flicker Jugraj Singh as his mentor. His aunt Rajbir Kaur also played internationally for India while her husband Gurmail Singh participated in the 1980 Summer Olympics where India won the gold medal.

References

External links
 Hardik Singh at Hockey India
 

1998 births
Living people
Indian male field hockey players
Field hockey players from Jalandhar
Olympic field hockey players of India
Field hockey players at the 2020 Summer Olympics
People from Jalandhar district
Male field hockey midfielders
2018 Men's Hockey World Cup players
Olympic bronze medalists for India
Medalists at the 2020 Summer Olympics
Olympic medalists in field hockey
Field hockey players at the 2022 Commonwealth Games
Commonwealth Games silver medallists for India
Commonwealth Games medallists in field hockey
Recipients of the Arjuna Award
2023 Men's FIH Hockey World Cup players
Medallists at the 2022 Commonwealth Games